Ferdinand August Bebel (22 February 1840 – 13 August 1913) was a German socialist politician, writer, and orator. He is best remembered as one of the founders of the Social Democratic Workers' Party of Germany (SDAP) in 1869, which in 1875 merged with the General German Workers' Association into the Socialist Workers' Party of Germany (SAPD). During the repression under the terms of the Anti-Socialist Laws, Bebel became the leading figure of the social democratic movement in Germany and from 1892 until his death served as chairman of the Social Democratic Party of Germany.

Biography

Early years
Ferdinand August Bebel, known as August, was born on 22 February 1840, in Deutz, Germany, now a part of Cologne. He was the son of a Prussian noncommissioned officer in the Prussian infantry, initially from Ostrowo in the Province of Posen, and was born in military barracks. The father died in 1844.

As a young man, Bebel apprenticed as a carpenter and joiner in Leipzig. Like most German workmen at that time, he travelled extensively in search of work and he thereby obtained a first-hand knowledge of the difficulties facing the working people of the day.

At Salzburg, where he lived for some time, he joined a Roman Catholic workmen's club. When in Tyrol in 1859 he volunteered for service in the war against Italy, but was rejected; and in his own country he was rejected likewise as physically unfit for the army.

In 1860 he settled in Leipzig as a master turner, making horn buttons. He joined various labour organisations. Although initially an opponent of socialism, Bebel gradually was won over to socialist ideas through pamphlets of Ferdinand Lassalle, which popularized the ideas of Karl Marx. In 1865 he came under the influence of Wilhelm Liebknecht and was thereafter committed fully to the socialist cause. In 1866 he joined the First International.

Political career

Following the death of Lassalle, Bebel was among the group of Socialists that refused to follow new party leader Johann Baptist von Schweitzer at the Eisenach Conference of 1867, an action which gave rise to the name "Eisenachers" for this Marxist faction. Together with Liebknecht, he founded the  Sächsische Volkspartei ("Saxon People's Party"). Bebel was also President of the Union of German Workers' Associations from 1867 and a member of the First International.

Bebel was elected to the North German Reichstag as a member from Saxony in that same year.

Bebel's great organizing talent and oratorical power quickly made him one of the leaders of the socialists and their chief spokesman in parliament. He remained a member of the North German Parliament, and later of its counterpart for the German Empire, the Reichstag, until his death, except for the interval of 1881–83. He represented successively the districts of Glauchau-Meerane, Dresden, Strassburg, and Hamburg. Later in his life, he acted as chairman of the SPD. Representing as he did Marxian principles, he was bitterly opposed by certain factions of his party.

In 1870 he spoke in parliament against the continuance of the war with France. Bebel and Liebknecht were the only members who did not vote the extraordinary subsidy required for the war with France. Bebel was one of only two socialists elected to the Reichstag in 1871, and he used his position to protest against the annexation of Alsace-Lorraine and to express his full sympathy with the Paris Commune. German Chancellor Otto von Bismarck afterwards said that this speech of Bebel's was a "ray of light" showing him that socialism was an enemy to be fought against and crushed. Falsely accused of being in league with the French and part of a conspiracy to free French prisoners of war held in Germany and to lead them in an attack from the rear, Bebel and Liebknecht were arrested for high treason, but no prosecution was possible for lack of evidence.

Not wanting to release such important opponents of the war effort, old charges of preaching dangerous doctrines and plotting against the state were levied against Bebel and Liebknecht in 1872. For insulting the German emperor, Bebel was additionally sentenced to nine months' ordinary imprisonment. This incarceration served to increase Bebel's prestige among his party associates and the sympathetic public at large.

In 1874 Bebel took a partner and founded a small button factory, for which he acted as salesman, but in 1889 he gave up his business to devote himself wholly to politics.  In 1868 he became connected with the staff of the Volksstaat ("The People's State") at Leipzig, and in 1891 with that of the Vorwärts ("Forward") at Berlin.

After his release from prison, he helped to organise, at the congress of Gotha, the united party of Social Democrats, which had been formed during his imprisonment. After the passing of the Socialist Law he continued to show great activity in the debates of the Reichstag, and was also elected a member of the Saxon parliament; when the state of siege was proclaimed in Leipzig he was expelled from the city, and in 1886 condemned to nine months' imprisonment for taking part in a secret society.

In party meetings of 1890 and 1891, Bebel's policies were severely attacked, first by the extremists, the "young" Socialists from Berlin, who wished to abandon parliamentary action; against these Bebel won a complete victory. On the other side he was involved in a quarrel with Volmar and his school, who desired to put aside from immediate consideration the complete attainment of the socialist ideal, and proposed that the party should aim at bringing about, not a complete overthrow of society, but a gradual amelioration. This conflict of tendencies continued, and Bebel came to be regarded as the chief exponent of the traditional views of the orthodox Marxist party. Though a strong opponent of militarism, he publicly stated that foreign nations attacking Germany must not expect the help or the neutrality of the Social Democrats. Already in 1911 amid the rising tensions between the European powers, Bebel publicly predicted an upcoming great war with millions of soldiers confronting each other followed by a great collapse, "mass bankruptcy, mass misery, mass unemployment and great famine."

In 1899, at the Hanover Congress of the SPD, Bebel delivered a speech condemning Eduard Bernstein's revisionism. His resolution, Attacks on the Fundamental Views and Tactics of the Party, garnered the support of the vast majority of the Congress, including Bernstein's supporters.

Class, race, religion and sex
Bebel particularly distinguished himself by his denunciation of the maltreatment of soldiers by officers and still more frequently by non-commissioned officers. His efforts in this matter had received great encouragement when King Albert of Saxony issued an edict dealing with the maltreatment of soldiers in the Saxon contingent, thus cutting the ground from under the feet of the Imperial Government, which had persistently attempted to deny or to explain away the cases put forward by Bebel.

Speaking before the Reichstag,  Bebel criticised the war to crush the Boxer Rebellion in China in 1900, saying:

Bebel is also famed for his outrage at the news of German mistreatment of indigenous people in German South-West Africa, the Herero nation in particular. In 1904 following a violent uprising by the Herero people against German officials, soldiers, and settlers, Imperial German Army General Lothar von Trotha launched the Herero and Namaqua Genocide to crush the revolt by waging a "war of extermination" against the Herero. In response, Bebel and the German Social Democratic Party became the only party in the Reichstag to oppose increased colonial expenditures, and in a speech in March 1904 Bebel classified the policy in German South-West Africa as "not only barbaric, but bestial." This caused some sections of the contemporary German press to scathingly classify Bebel as "Der hereroische Bebel" (Bebel the Hereroic") (Coburger Zeitung, 17 January 1904). Bebel was not deterred; he later followed this up with strongly worded warnings against the rising tide of theories of racial hierarchy and racial purity, causing the 1907 general election to the Reichstag in 1907 to go down in history as the "Hottentot Election."

Bebel's book, Women and Socialism was translated into English by Daniel De Leon of the Socialist Labor Party of America as Woman under Socialism. It figured prominently in the Connolly-DeLeon controversy after James Connolly, then a member of the SLP, denounced it as a "quasi-prurient" book that would repel potential recruits to the socialist movement. The book contained an attack on the institution of marriage which identified Bebel with the most extreme forms of socialism. In the preface to DeLeon's translation, Woman Under Socialism, DeLeon distanced himself from Bebel on this point, holding that monogamy was the most desirable form of social organisation.

In 1898 he voiced his support for the decriminalisation of homosexuality in the Reichstag.

Bebel said that religion is a "private matter", claiming that the SPD should be neutral on the question of religion, while in actuality advocating secularism. Bebel considered himself both a patriot and an internationalist believing them to not be antagonistic but instead supplemental.

Death and legacy
August Bebel died on 13 August 1913 of a heart attack during a visit to a sanatorium in Passugg, Switzerland. He was 73 years old at the time of his death. His body was buried in Zürich.

At the time of his death Bebel was eulogized by Russian Marxist leader Vladimir Lenin as a "model workers' leader," who had proven himself able to "break his own road" from being an ordinary worker into becoming a political leader in the struggle for a "better social system."

The well-known saying "Anti-Semitism is the socialism of fools" ("Der Antisemitismus ist der Sozialismus der dummen Kerle") is frequently attributed to Bebel, but probably originated with the Austrian democrat Ferdinand Kronawetter; it was in general use among German Social Democrats by the 1890s.

Along with Karl Marx, Friedrich Engels and Ferdinand Lassalle, Bebel was among the socialist icons included in bas relief portraits on the facade of The Forward building, erected in 1912 as the headquarters of the New York Yiddish-language socialist newspaper.

English language works
 Women in the Past, Present, and Future. London: Reeves, 1885. US Edition: San Francisco: G. Benham, 1897.
 Assassinations and Socialism: From a Speech by August Bebel, Delivered at Berlin, November 2, 1898. New York: New York Labor News Co., n.d. [c. 1899].
 Beber. New York: International Publishers, 1901.
 Socialism and the German Kaiser: Two Speeches. With Georg Heinrich von Vollmar. London: Clarion Press, 1903.
 Women Under Socialism. New York: New York Labor News Co., 1904. New translation: Women and Socialism. New York: Socialist Literature Co., 1910.
 Trade Unions and Political Parties. Milwaukee: Social-Democratic Publishing Co., 1906.
 Bebel's Reminiscences. New York: Socialist Literature Co., 1911.
 The Intellectual Ability of Women. New York: Cooperative Press, n.d. [c. 1912].
 My Life. London: T. Fisher Unwin, 1912.
 Speeches of August Bebel. New York: International Publishers, 1928.
 Society of the Future. Moscow: Progress Publishers. 1976. (an abridged translation of the last part of Bebel's Women and Socialism)

See also
Bebelplatz, public square in Berlin named after August Bebel

References

External links

 
 
Biography of August Bebel. Retrieved 31 May 2007.
August Bebel Internet Archive, Marxists Internet Archive, www.marxists.org/ Retrieved 31 August 2010.

 Ulrich Rippert: August Bebel and the political awakening of the working class, wsws.org Retrieved 28 August 2013.
 Archive of August Bebel Papers at the International Institute of Social History
 

1840 births
1913 deaths
Politicians from Cologne
Politicians from Leipzig
People from the Rhine Province
Social Democratic Party of Germany politicians
Members of the Reichstag of the North German Confederation
Members of the 1st Reichstag of the German Empire
Members of the 2nd Reichstag of the German Empire
Members of the 3rd Reichstag of the German Empire
Members of the 4th Reichstag of the German Empire
Members of the 6th Reichstag of the German Empire
Members of the 7th Reichstag of the German Empire
Members of the 8th Reichstag of the German Empire
Members of the 9th Reichstag of the German Empire
Members of the 10th Reichstag of the German Empire
Members of the 11th Reichstag of the German Empire
Members of the 12th Reichstag of the German Empire
Members of the 13th Reichstag of the German Empire
Members of the Second Chamber of the Diet of the Kingdom of Saxony
Prussian politicians
German socialist feminists
Political party founders
Male feminists
Marxist theorists
German prisoners and detainees